Milan Popovic (born 19 February) is a Serbian TV personality, musician and influencer.

Popovic was born in the 1980s with cerebral palsy, and nowadays he is only influencer, model and motivational figure for disabled people in Ex-Yugoslavia.

He rose to fame in 2013 after his participation as songwriter for the first season of X Factor Adria. Popovic was a songwriter for two songs "Necu Da se Zaljubim" for Aleksa Perovic and "Hajde Mala" for Stefan Koković.

Years ago before his participation on the X Factor, Popovic worked as celebrity publicist of Serbian pop singer Milan Stankovic who represented Serbia at Eurovision Song Contest 2010 in Oslo.

In June 2019 Popovic officially started his musical career with debut single "Produzeni vikend" featuring famous Serbian singer, songweriter and TV personality Ognjen Amidzic. The song became Summer Hit and won Award On Music Festival in Vrnjacka Banja, Serbia.

Milan’s single "Gazella" was released on 15 September 2020.

Right now Popovic is TV journalist on Pink’s "Celebrity Short Form "EkskluzivNo" where he interviewed several Serbian celebrities.

References

Living people
Year of birth missing (living people)
Serbian journalists